In the philosophy of mind, double-aspect theory is the view that the mental and the physical are two aspects of, or perspectives on, the same substance. It is also called dual-aspect monism, not to be confused with mind–body dualism. The theory's relationship to neutral monism is ill-defined, but one proffered distinction says that whereas neutral monism allows the context of a given group of neutral elements to determine whether the group is mental, physical, both, or neither, double-aspect theory requires the mental and the physical to be inseparable and mutually irreducible (though distinct).

According to Harald Atmanspacher, "dual-aspect approaches consider the mental and physical domains of reality as aspects, or manifestations, of an underlying undivided reality in which the mental and the physical do not exist as separate domains. In such a framework, the distinction between mind and matter results from an epistemic split that separates the aspects of the underlying reality. Consequently, the status of the psychophysically neutral domain is considered as ontic relative to the mind–matter distinction."

Theories
Possible double-aspect theorists include:
 Baruch Spinoza, who believed that Nature or God (Deus sive Natura) had two aspects, Extension and Mind.
 Arthur Schopenhauer, who considered the fundamental aspects of reality to be Will and Representation.
 David Bohm, who used implicate and explicate order as a means of displaying dual-aspects.
 Gustav Fechner
 Mark Solms, neuropsychoanalist, for whom dual-aspect monism represents a matrix of ontological juxtaposition of psychoanalytical and neuroscientific knowledge from two distinct perspectives: looking from the inside and looking from the outside.
 George Henry Lewes
 Thomas Jay Oord - calls his version "Material-Mental Monism"
 John Polkinghorne
 Brian O'Shaughnessy on the dual aspect theory of the Will
 Thomas Nagel.
 David Chalmers, who explores a double-aspect view of information, with similarities to Kenneth Sayre's information-based neutral monism

Pauli-Jung conjecture 

Pauli and Jung's approach to dual-aspect monism has a very specific further feature, namely that different aspects may show a complementarity in a quantum physical sense. That is, the Pauli-Jung conjecture implies that with regard to mental and physical states there may be incompatible descriptions of different parts that emerge from the whole. This stands in close analogy to quantum physics, where complementary properties cannot be determined jointly with accuracy.

Atmanspacher further refers to Paul Bernays' views on complementarity in physics and in philosophy when he states that "Two descriptions are complementary if they mutually exclude each other, yet are both necessary to describe a situation exhaustively."

See also
Anomalous monism
Neutral monism
Property dualism
Samkhya darsana

Notes

External links
Neutral Monism in Relation to Dual Aspect Theory

Theory of mind
Monism
Spinozism
Spinoza studies